Spaniards in the United Kingdom are people of Spanish descent resident in Britain. They may be British citizens or non-citizen immigrants.

Historical migration of royalty
Spanish and English royalty intermarried on numerous occasions, a notable example is found in King Edward I and Eleanor of Castile, parents of King Edward II. In 1501, Catherine of Aragon came to London aged 15. After the early death of her first husband, she became Henry VIII's first wife. Their daughter, Mary Tudor attempted to re-introduce Catholicism as the state religion during her own reign and married Philip II of Spain. Both women at that time brought the influence of Spanish culture to the royal court.

Demographics

The 2001 UK Census recorded 54,482 Spanish-born people. 54,105 of these were resident in Great Britain (that is, the UK excluding Northern Ireland). The equivalent figure in the 1991 Census was 38,606. The census tracts with the highest numbers of Spanish-born residents in 2001 were Kensington, Regent's Park and Chelsea, all in west London. The 2011 UK Census recorded 77,554 Spanish-born residents in England, 1,630 in Wales, 4,908 in Scotland and 703 in Northern Ireland. According to Instituto Nacional de Estadística statistics, the number of Spanish citizens registered with the Spanish consulate in the UK was 102,498 as of 1 January 2016. The Office for National Statistics estimates that the Spanish-born population of the UK was 164,000 in 2020.

Economics
According to analysis by the Institute for Public Policy Research, 71.22 per cent of recent Spanish immigrants to the UK of working age are employed as opposed to unemployed or inactive (which includes students), compared to 73.49 per cent of British-born people. 15.05 per cent of recent Spanish-born immigrants are low earners, defined as having an income of less than £149.20 per week (compared to 21.08 per cent of British-born people), and 2.15 per cent are high earners, earning more than £750 per week (compared to 6.98 per cent of British-born people). Amongst settled Spanish-born immigrants, 71.48 per cent are employed, with 23.44 per cent being low earners and 7.81 per cent high earners.

Education
There is a Spanish school in London, Instituto Español Vicente Cañada Blanch.

Notable people

See also

Spain–United Kingdom relations
Spanish Australian
British migration to Spain
Gibraltarians in the United Kingdom

References

 
Immigration to the United Kingdom by country of origin